Gregory Smith (born 3 July 1986) is a Caymanian cricketer. He played in two matches for the Cayman Islands cricket team in the 2017 ICC World Cricket League Division Five tournament in South Africa.

In August 2019, he was named in the Cayman Islands cricket team's Twenty20 International (T20I) squad for the Regional Finals of the 2018–19 ICC T20 World Cup Americas Qualifier tournament. In April 2022, he was named in the Cayman Islands' T20I squad for their series against the Bahamas. He made his T20I debut on 16 April 2022, for the Cayman Islands against the Bahamas.

References

External links
 

1986 births
Living people
Caymanian cricketers
Cayman Islands Twenty20 International cricketers
Place of birth missing (living people)